Warren Brown (August 11, 1836 – September 19, 1919) was an American politician, historian, gentleman farmer, businessman, and author from Hampton Falls, New Hampshire.

Biography

Early life
Warren Brown was born in Hampton Falls, New Hampshire, the only child of John Berry and Sarah March Leavitt Brown.  He was educated in the North School in Hampton Falls, the old Rockingham Academy in Hampton, and Phillips-Andover Academy in Andover, Massachusetts.

Later life
Brown married Sarah Gertrude Norris on January 1, 1867. Sarah was a native of Raymond and Dover, New Hampshire, and a daughter of Daniel L. Norris and Sophia (Osgood) Norris, born November 17, 1841.  She was raised by her aunt Lavinia Osgood Meserve (Mrs. Samuel) in Lowell, Massachusetts, where she received her education.  She subsequently moved to Hampton, where she taught in the public schools until her marriage. Warren and Sarah had five children:

Unnamed male (August 4, 1868 – August 4, 1868)
Harry Benson (June 8, 1870 – June 18, 1903)
Arthur Warren (July 20, 1873 – 1960) married Frances Wadleigh (1881–1966) on October 11, 1906
 Their children:     
 Charles Warren Brown (July 16, 1909)      
 Lois Wadleigh (May 2, 1911)      
 Harold Arthur (July 31, 1913)      
 Elinor Frances (December 12, 1915)      
 Ernest Norris (January 13, 1918      
 Winthrop Marshall (February 3, 1921)
Gertrude Norris (May 17, 1878 – May 17, 1896)
 Mildred Leavitt (April 3, 1880 – December 5, 1965) married Roscoe Franklin Swain (1881–1946) on June 11, 1908
 Their children:       
 Marjorie Morrill (July 9, 1909 – July 16, 1909)       
 Pearl Elizabeth (February 2, 1911 – November 23, 1986)       
 Kenneth Warren (August 9, 1913 – September 6, 2003)       
 Dorothy Gertrude (June 30, 1918 – February 17, 2011)

Sarah Brown died on January 24, 1917, after celebrating the couple's Golden Wedding anniversary on January 1 of that year. She was eulogized by her husband as being a "person of great executive ability and force of character."

Brown had a lifelong interest in agricultural matters. He managed and worked one of the largest and most productive farms in Rockingham County. His farm included orchards, salt marsh, dairy cattle, sheep and gardens sufficient to maintain his family and the employees for whom he provided room and board.

Brown was president of the New Hampshire State Agricultural Society for eleven years, treasurer of the New England Agricultural Society for twenty-five years, trustee of the New Hampshire College of Agriculture and the Mechanic Arts for 24 years, including four years served as chairman of the board.

In addition to agricultural interests, Brown was active in state politics. He was a state senator in 1872–73, a member of the state's Executive Council from 1879 to 1881 during the term of Natt Head as Governor, and a delegate to the 1884 Republican National Convention in Chicago, Illinois. He was a state representative in 1887, and a presidential elector in 1908. He was also a Freemason. Brown was a stockholder and active promoter of the electric railways in southern New Hampshire, and owned and operated a sawmill on his estate.

Brown was a true native son, descended from many of the original settlers of the New Hampshire Seacoast Region, and very interested in his town's history. He wrote a two-volume history of Hampton Falls: History of Hampton Falls, N.H. Volume I and History of Hampton Falls, N.H. Volume II. Volume I spans from 1640 to 1900, while Volume II spans from 1900 to 1917.

Death
Brown died September 19, 1919.  He was buried in the family lot in the Westview Cemetery of Hampton Falls. He was predeceased by his wife Sarah, his daughter Gertrude and his son Harry.

Residence

Brown owned and operated a highly successful farm on family land purchased by his father in 1812. On this property, in 1880, he built a Victorian style home which replaced his parents' center-chimney colonial house. This new home, called Sunnyside, was designed by his beloved wife Sarah Gertrude; architectural plans were drawn for her by a Mr. Bruce of Newburyport, Massachusetts.  The house remained in the family until the 1960s.  Its unique presence in a town of mainly colonial styled architecture, its resemblance to The Addams Family house and the years between owners when it was vacant, have perhaps helped to make it the source of speculation by locals and newcomers alike.

For many years, a rumor circulated stating that Brown made an unsuccessful run for Governor of New Hampshire and that his Victorian style house was built in anticipation of its being "the Governor's mansion", a name it became known by. In truth, his wife Sarah, a woman of innovation and industry, designed Sunnyside to be a practical and beautiful home where the couple could entertain in style and operate their large estate with efficiently. After numerous experiences, the current owners have brought in many paranormal teams to prove spectral activity on this property and had it investigated in 2012 by The Atlantic Paranormal Society ( T.A.P.S.) for the Syfy television series Ghost Hunters.

Legacy
Brown Road, abutting his former property in Hampton Falls, is named for Warren Brown.  His volumes chronicling the history of Hampton Falls have continued to be invaluable resources for genealogists, historians, and related fields.

Sources
 Brown, Marguerite Willette. Genealogy of John Brown of Hampton, New Hampshire, 1977,  Hillside Publishing Co., Amesbury, Massachusetts.
 Crowell, Suzanne Perfect. Sunnyside Files. 1976. Offset House, South Burlington, Vermont.
 Newspaper clipping from The Union, dated August 11, 1919
 Diaries of Warren and Sarah Brown
 Interviews with descendants of Warren and Sarah Brown

References

Further reading

External links
 History of Hampton Falls, N.H. (Vol. I) via Wayback Machine
 History of Hampton Falls, N.H. (Vol. II) via Wayback Machine
 

1836 births
1919 deaths
19th-century American politicians
1908 United States presidential electors
Republican Party New Hampshire state senators
Members of the Executive Council of New Hampshire
American Freemasons